Major General Edwin Kwamina Sam (born 10 August 1940) is a member of the Council of State of Ghana. He is also a former Chief of the Defence Staff of the Ghana Armed Forces.

Education 

Edwin Sam had his secondary school education at Achimota School between 1955 and 1959.

Career 

Sam was a career military officer. He was appointed as the Chief of the Defence Staff briefly between November and December 1979.

Politics 

Edwin Sam was appointed onto the Council of State of Ghana due to his position as a former Chief of Defence Staff.

Other interests

Major General Sam has interests in farming and military-civilian relations.

References 

Living people
Ghanaian soldiers
1940 births
Alumni of Achimota School
National Defence College, India alumni